Lacco Ameno is a town and comune situated in the northwest of the island of Ischia, in the Metropolitan City of Naples off the west coast of Italy. The town has a population of around 4,800 inhabitants.

It is located at the feet of Mount Epomeo, facing the sea. The name most likely derives from the Greek lakkos, meaning "stone". The name ameno was added to the official name in 1862.

On July 28, 1883, Lacco Ameno was severely damaged by an earthquake; together with the neighboring town of Casamicciola, the earthquake claimed over 2,300 victims. 269 houses, about 69% of the entire building fabric, were completely destroyed, and only 18 buildings remained undamaged.

However, this could not stop the change from a fishing village to a health resort with thermal springs. The Italian publisher Angelo Rizzoli made Lacco Ameno a place for the international jet set by building several hotels in the 1950s and 1960s. In 1962 he also donated to the only hospital on Ischia, "Ospedale Anna Rizzoli".

On August 21, 2017, a moderate magnitude 4 earthquake struck Lacco Ameno and Casamicciola Terme, killing two people, partially collapsing a church and destroying several houses.

Main sights
Lacco Ameno is home to an 11th-century church, built over a pre-existing Palaeo-Christian edifice. The Museum of Santa Restituta houses several prehistorical findings and Greek ceramics from the 8th-2nd centuries BC. 
There are many luxury hotels and boutiques frequented, especially in the summer months.

References

External links
Official website 

Cities and towns in Campania
Ischia